Qaflankuh may refer to:
Qaflankuh-e Gharbi Rural District
Qaflankuh-e Sharqi Rural District